Phloeodes diabolicus (formerly Nosoderma diabolicum), common name: diabolical ironclad beetle, is a beetle of the Family Zopheridae. It is found in deserts of western North America, where it lives on fungi growing under tree bark. It is flightless and has a lifespan of two years, compared to the weeks or months long lifespan of typical beetles.

This beetle is noted for its durability. Its thick, densely layered and interlocking elytra, connected to the ventral cuticle by complex lateral support structures, are able to support maximum force of 149 newtons, approximately equal to the force exerted by 15 kilograms or 33.069 lbs.

Shell structure 
These inch-long beetles have the potential for extremely long lifespans due to their structure and shape.  Many beetles have a rounded body, but the diabolical ironclad is different, having a flat shape and low-to-the-ground profile makes these beetles extremely hard to squash.  The compression is not focused on one spot but rather spread across the shell evenly distributing the force over the whole shell.  The shell provides many issues for entomologists trying to display their specimen.  The beetles cannot be mounted normally using stainless steel pins, but rather they need to drill holes in the shell where they desire to place the pin.

Utilizing a jigsaw-like layering of their joints and appendages provide stability to withstand such extreme forces. This is done by layering multiple different scales of different sizes, ranging from microscopic to visible sizes, providing exceptional mechanical strength. The jigsaw pattern seen is a multilayered exoskeleton, including a waterproof epicuticle, an underlying exocuticle and lastly an internal endocuticle. In each of the cuticles, polysaccharide α-chitin combine with proteins to form fibers within each layer. These fibers are twisted and stacked upon each other creating a "helicoid" arrangement, forming laminated structures. This formation allows for strong, energy-absorbent and tolerant structures. Being energy absorbent the skeleton is able to deflect, twist and arrest crack propagation between each layer. The lack of flight allows the hardened elytra to be locked in place with the hindwings which aids the structure.  Using a compositional analysis it was found that the microstructure of exoskeleton is protein-rich and contains no inorganic structure (common in crustacean exoskeleton), while also containing a thicker endocuticle than other insects.

There are two main areas that allow the skeleton to endure such forces as much as 39,000 times its own body weight. The first is the connection between the two halves of the shell: the interconnections are zipper-like providing additional strength and are stiff and resist bending pressure.  The back of the beetle is not interlocked in the same way allowing the bottom halves to slide past each other, providing flexibility to absorb squishing compression.  The second area is the puzzle-like design that runs the length of the back connecting the left and right side.  Protrusions called blades fit together like jigsaw pieces, glued together by proteins aiding in damage resistance.  The connection allows the blades to absorb impacts without snapping.  The protection allows the beetle to be almost predator proof, denying most species the ability to break the shell.

References

External links

Zopheridae
Beetles described in 1851